Hamlin Township is the name of some places in the U.S. state of Michigan:

 Hamlin, Raisinville Township, Michigan, a former community 
 Hamlin Township, Eaton County, Michigan
 Hamlin Township, Mason County, Michigan

See also
Hamlin Township (disambiguation)

Michigan township disambiguation pages